University Hall was an 8,457-seat multi-purpose arena on the University of Virginia Grounds in Charlottesville, Virginia. The arena opened in 1965 as a replacement for Memorial Gym; it was demolished on May 25, 2019, with Ralph Sampson leading the demolition. Like many arenas built at the time, the arena was circular, with a ribbed concrete roof and blue and orange seats (the orange seats arranged in a "V" near the top of each section) that surrounded the arena. Unlike many other facilities, however, the floor was never lowered for additional seating around the court, which left large areas behind press row, the team benches, and the announcer's table empty during games.

University Hall was replaced by the John Paul Jones Arena as the home to the men's and women's basketball teams in 2006.

UVa's athletic department held "final game" ceremonies for University Hall in connection with the men's basketball game against the Maryland Terrapins on March 5, 2006. UVA legend Ralph Sampson sank ceremonial "last baskets" at U-Hall, dunking twice during postgame festivities. 

However, the women's basketball team made the Women's National Invitational Tournament and played and won two WNIT games in University Hall.

Records

References

External links
 "JPJ rocks: But what about ol UHall?" article in The Hook weekly

Buildings of the University of Virginia
College volleyball venues in the United States
College wrestling venues in the United States
Basketball venues in Virginia
Virginia Cavaliers basketball venues
Defunct college basketball venues in the United States
1965 establishments in Virginia
2006 disestablishments in Virginia
Sports venues demolished in 2019
Buildings and structures demolished by controlled implosion